al-Maghar was a Palestinian Arab village in the Ramle Subdistrict of Mandatory Palestine. It was depopulated by the Givati Brigade during Operation Barak on 18 May 1948. It was located 12 km southwest of Ramla, situated north of Wadi al-Maghar.

History
An inscription which was in  Greek, and dated to a Christian period was found here.

In the 8th century, the village was the birthplace of the Islamic jurist Abu al-Hasan Muhammad al-Maghari.

Ottoman era
In 1517, Al-Maghar, like the rest of  Palestine, was incorporated into the Ottoman Empire, and in the 1596 tax registers the village appeared under the name of Imgar,  as being in the nahiya (subdistrict) of Gaza under the Liwa of Gaza, with   a population was 22 households, all Muslim. The villagers paid a fixed tax rate of 33,3% on various agricultural products, such as   wheat, barley, summer crops, fruit trees, olive trees, and sesame; a total of  6,400  akçe.

In 1838, el Mughar was noted  by Edward Robinson from Aqir, he further noted it as a Muslim village in the Gaza district.

In 1863  Victor Guérin  found a village with about 200 inhabitants  living in  adobe houses. He further noted  "vast fields, of which the extreme fertility delights the sight." The barley  was already partially harvested, and elsewhere the plain was seeded with corn and   durrah.

An Ottoman village list of about 1870 indicated 54 houses and a population of 174, though the population count included men, only.

In 1882, the PEF's Survey of Western Palestine (SWP)  described it as consisting almost entirely of adobe houses, "occupying the south slope of the hill, and built in front of caves in the rock. There are fig-gardens beneath, and pasture-land round it on the north and east. The village is not larger than most of those in the plain."  "It has two  wells: one north, one west."   Figs were noted here.

The Battle of Mughar Ridge between British and Ottoman forces in the World War I was fought in the environs of Al-Maghar.

British Mandate  era
In the 1922 census of Palestine conducted by the British Mandate authorities, Mughar had a population of 966 inhabitants, all Muslims, while in  the 1931 census, Mughar had 255 occupied houses and a population of 1,211 Muslims.

In the 1945 statistics, it had a population of 1,740 Muslims, and the total land area was 15,390 dunums. Of this, Arabs used a total of 1,772 dunums for citrus and bananas, 9,075 dunums were used for cereals, 86 dunums were irrigated or used for orchards,  while 31 dunams were classified as built-up urban areas.

It had an elementary school  and in 1945, it had an enrollment of 170 students.

1948, and aftermath
The village was attacked, occupied and ethnically cleansed on  18 May 1948. In early 1949 American Quaker relief workers reported that many those living in tents in what became Maghazi refugee camp had come from Al-Maghar.

The Israeli moshav of Beit Elazari is built on the destroyed Palestinian town of Al-Maghar and its land.

References

Bibliography

External links
Welcome To al-Maghar
al-Maghar, Zochrot
Survey of Western Palestine, Map 16:   IAA, Wikimedia commons  
al-Maghar, from the Khalil Sakakini Cultural Center

Arab villages depopulated during the 1948 Arab–Israeli War
District of Ramla